Ubieranie do snu – sixth album in Marcin Rozynek's music career and fourth artist's solo album. It was released February 9, 2009.

Track listing 
"Ubieranie do snu (Naukowcy zaskoczeni gigantycznym obszarem pozbawionym energii)" - 3:45
"Tok Music - Utwór nagrany ze Steve'm Barney'em" - 5:29
"Make Love Not Pis" - 4:26
"Piano" - 4:21
"Z kolekcji Wiosna 2009" - 3:38
"Western Digital" - 3:27
"Pierwsze strony gazet" - 3:40
"Masterfood" - 4:50
"Mexyk" - 4:05
"Nigdy nie patrz w dół" - 3:30
"Last minute - Filipowi na wieki" - 4:04

Singles 
"Pierwsze strony gazet" (2007)
"Nigdy nie patrz w dół" (2008)
"Last minute" (2008)
"Ubieranie do snu" (2009)
"Piano" (2009)
"Z kolekcji Wiosna 2009" (2009)
"Tok Music" (2009)

External links
 Label's note about the album

2009 albums
Marcin Rozynek albums